Óscar Eduardo Uscanga Gutiérrez (born January 31, 1990) is a Mexican football attacking midfielder currently playing for Tampico Madero, in Ascenso MX.

Uscanga and his younger brother, Francisco, made the Atlante bench for the Clausura 2009 season. Both of them have been splitting time at Atlante's filial team, Potros Chetumal.

External links
 

1990 births
Living people
Footballers from Veracruz
Mexican footballers
Liga MX players
Atlante F.C. footballers
Association football forwards
People from Coatzacoalcos